Nettleton is a village and civil parish about  northwest of Chippenham in Wiltshire, England.  The parish includes the villages of Burton and West Kington, and the hamlets of Horsedown, Nettleton Shrub and West Kington Wick.  The northern section of Nettleton village is known as Nettleton Green.

Until 1934, Burton and Nettleton were separate parishes.

Geography
The eastern limit of the parish is the boundary with the county of Gloucestershire. The Burton Brook and Broadmead Brook flow through the north and south of the parish respectively, meeting to form the Bybrook River on the eastern boundary of the parish. Nettleton Mill, an ancient watermill which was part of the Castle Combe estate, is on the Broadmead Brook at the southeastern boundary of the parish. The Fosse Way runs through the parish, crossing both brooks.

History
Excavations in the 19th century found 28 human skeletons in its chambers.
Remains of a Romano-British settlement of about 30 buildings have been found in the north-west of the parish, where the Fosse Way crosses the Broadmead Brook, south-west of Brotton Hill wood. This was excavated between 1956 and 1971; it is now field and woodland again. It was interpreted as a religious site, including an octagonal shrine some 10 metres in diameter. Apollo Cunomaglus may have been its overall patron; dedications to other deities, probably including Diana, Mercury, and Mars with his Gaulish consort Rosmerta, were also found.

Domesday Book recorded 24 households in 1086.

Religion
Nettleton has had a Baptist chapel since 1823.

The parish church is St Mary's at Burton; West Kington has a church of St Mary the Virgin. The benefice of Littleton Drew (in Grittleton civil parish) was united with Nettleton in 1960. Today the parish is served by the Bybrook Team Ministry.

References

Sources

External links 

 Nettleton Parish Council
 

Villages in Wiltshire
Civil parishes in Wiltshire
Roman sites in England
Archaeological sites in Wiltshire